Christopher Rojas (born 1982) is a multi-platinum composer, musician, songwriter, and record producer. He is also the co-founder of DigiTour Media.

NR Studio
Photography_Videography _ Editor 
iT Master( Hardware & Software)
Data Recovery Studio ( SSD ,HHD , Memory Card , Camera Cards.etc 
C.E.O. M Nabeel Shahid (03000262644-03426262644 ) in Punjab Layyah

Career
In the year 2003 Rojas signed with publisher Zomba Enterprises and BMG. He has also  collaborated with several musicians and artists, including Big Time Rush, P!nk, Backstreet Boys, Heidi Montag, Tiffany Evans, Jessica Simpson, Delta Goodrem, Jamie-Lynn Sigler, Vanessa Hudgens, Corbin Bleu, and Teddy Geiger., as well as Anastacia, MC Lars, Pink, Brian Littrell.

In 2011 rojas along with Meridith Valiando Rojas co-founded DigiTour Media, a company that produced the world's first YouTube tour. He was then recognized by the Los Angeles Business Journal's annual "20 in their 20s" list as a notable Social Media entrepreneur in 2012.

In 2013, Rojas launched the Cyrus family YouTube channel "Seriously Cyrus" in partnership with his wife Meridith Valiando Rojas. The channel featured daily shows by various family members, including Billy Ray Cyrus and Noah Cyrus, and all programming was produced by Rojas and Valiando for their consulting company, RECon Inc.

Partial discography
 2001, Here to Heaven, Jamie-Lynn Sigler
 2003, Peace, Jim Brickman
 2003, Secret Is Out, Darryl
 2004, In This Skin, Jessica Simpson
 2004, Mistaken Identity, Delta Goodrem
 2004, Naked Truth, Sarah Hudson
 2004, Now That's What I Call Music! Vol. 16, Various Artists
 2004, Now That's What I Call Music! Vol. 17, Various Artists
 2004, Rejoyce: The Christmas Album, Jessica Simpson
 2004, Sick and Tired [EP], Anastacia
 2004, Take My Breath Away/Fly, Jessica Simpson
 2005, Angels, (single) Jessica Simpson
 2005, In This Skin, Jessica Simpson
 2006, Never Gone, Backstreet Boys
 2006, The Graduate, MC Lars
 2006, Walmart Nation, MC Lars
 2006, I'm Not Dead, Pink
 2006, Nobody Knows, Pink
 2006, Now That's What I Call Music! Vol. 22, Various Artists
 2006, Now That's What I Call Music! Vol. 23, Various Artists
 2006, Underage Thinking, Teddy Geiger
 2006, Welcome Home, Brian Littrell
 2007, Another Side, Corbin Bleu
 2007, Dear Mr. President, Pink
 2007, I'm Not Dead, Pink
 2007, Pink Box, Pink
 2008, Identified, Vanessa Hudgens
 2008, Holiday Hits 2005, Vol. 5, Various Artist
 2008, Pinoy Biggest Hits, Various Artists
 2009, "Speak Love", (single) Hugh Sheridan
 2009, "Sexy People" (single), Lolene
 2010, "Electrick Hotel", Lolene
 2010, "Superficial", Heidi Montag
 2010, "Bittersweet" (single), Sophie Ellis-Bextor
 2010, "Can I", Jaicko
 2010, "B.T.R.", Big Time Rush
 2010, "Daddy I'm A Rockstar", Cymphonique
 2010, "I <3 U Crazy Mad", Going the Distance (film)
 2011, "What Does It Take", (single) Dave Days
 2011, "Supergood, Superbad", Tomohisa Yamashita
 2011, "Checkmate", Namie Amuro
 2011, "#1", (single) Namie Amuro
 2011, "Dance With Me", (single) Justice Crew ft. Flo Rida
 2011, "Worldwide", (single) Big Time Rush
 2011, "Run", Jessica Mauboy
 2011, "Sexy People", Bucky Larson: Born to Be a Star (film)
 2011, Elevate, Big Time Rush
 2013, We Are Myname, Myname
 2014, "The Real Thing", (single) Femme
 2014, "Come On Make It Happy", (single) Jordin Sparks, Beatrice Miller, Janel Parrish
 2015, "Aurora", Iyaz
 2016, "Last Text", (single) Jacob Sartorius

References

External links
Christopher Rojas at MSN Music
[ Christopher Rojas credits] at Allmusic
[ Christopher Rojas songs] at Allmusic
Christopher Rojas official website

1982 births
People from Queens, New York
Record producers from New York (state)
Living people